Dinh Q. Lê (born 1968; Vietnamese name: Lê Quang Đỉnh) is a Vietnamese American multimedia artist, best known for his photography work and photo-weaving technique. Lê is a prominent Asian artist who has exhibited work all around the globe. Many of his works consider the Vietnam War as well as methods of memory and how it connects to the present. Other series of his, such as his From Hollywood to Vietnam explore the relation of pop culture to personal memory and the difference between history and its portrayals in media.

Early life and education
Lê was born in 1968 in Hà Tiên, a Vietnamese town near the Cambodia border. The Cambodian-Vietnamese War of the 1970s brought Khmer Rouge troops to the region. When he was ten, in 1978, his family escaped. When the journey began, Lê was accompanied by his six siblings and his mother. However, while the ten year-old Lê made it safely onto the boat along with his mother, his other siblings did not. In an interview published in a catalogue for one of his exhibitions, he recalled the story of the escape. It was a "desperate run for freedom," and he said that he "[would] never forget the look on his mother's face as she scoured the beach...for signs of her eldest sons and daughter." After a brief stay in Thailand, the family eventually moved across the ocean and settled in Los Angeles. 

After Lê received BFA degree in photography from University of California, Santa Barbara, he began his own career as an artist. He began to weave photos, inspired by the grass-mat weaving lessons he had from his aunt when he was a child. He earned his MFA degree from The School of Visual Arts in New York. His artwork includes installation, video, sculpture, and urban intervention.

Career

By weaving strips of photos together using a planting procedure, Lê creates large-scale photographic montages. Images are layered in a repetition of patterning with glossy tapestries made entirely out of type C prints. Linen tape is used to finish the edges, with meticulous and precise craftsmanship.

His work includes both his collective memories and anxieties. His mixed feelings are presented by different characters in his work such as "The cowgirl-costumed Playboy Bunny toting a toy pistol from Apocalypse Now intertwined with South Vietnamese General Nguyễn Ngọc Loan and Viet Cong suspect Bay L op". 

He also worked with Cambodian refugee children and often addresses personal experience of life in Vietnam during and after the war.

Lê's artwork has been the theme of solo exhibitions at the Houston Center for Photography, the Los Angeles Center for Photographic Studies in an exhibition titled The Headless Buddha, which traveled to Portland, Oregon, Cambridge, Massachusetts and Santa Cruz, California. In 2000 he presented the exhibition "Cambodia: Splendour and Darkness" at the Speed Art Museum, Louisville, Kentucky. In 2004, he was included in Beyond Boundaries: Contemporary Photography In California, an exhibition which traveled to California State University, Long Beach, California and to the Friends of Photography in San Francisco, California. This show follows his exhibition at the UC Santa Barbara Museum in Spring 2003.

The first major survey of Dinh's work, "A Tapestry of Memories: The Art of Dinh Q. Le", was organized by Bellevue Arts Museum, in Bellevue, WA, and an accompanying catalog was published.

The Museum of Modern Art (New York) and the San Francisco Museum of Modern Art have also acquired his works since 2004. The Asia Society has invited Dinh Q. Lê to participate in a solo show in 2005.

In 2007, Lê co-founded the non-profit art space Sàn Art (Ho Chi Minh City) along with Tiffany Chung and Tuan Andrew Nguyen and Phunam Thuc Ha of The Propeller Group.

The Sherman Contemporary Art Foundation, Sydney, Australia commissioned and exhibited Erasure – an interactive sculptural and video installation that draws on recent debates in Australia concerning refugees and asylum seekers – which was shown from July – September, 2011.

In 2015, his work was the subject of a retrospective at the Mori Art Museum in Tokyo. 

In 2016 he produced "The Colony", an installation about a guano island. It was supported by Artangel.

In 2018 he curated Guerilla Tactics, a solo show of contemporary ceramics by the artist Nguyen Quoc Chanh at MoT+++ in Ho Chi Minh City, Vietnam.

In 2018, the University of Michigan Museum of Art acquired his 1994 piece Interconfined, which depicts a man standing between Buddha and a Christ-like figure.

Awards

Gunk Foundation Public Project Grant in 1998
NEA Fellowship in Photography 1994
The Dupont Fellowship in 1994
The Aaron Siskind Fellowship in 1992
The Prince Claus Fund Award in 2010

References

External links

Sàn Art 
Dinh Q. Lê at Kadist Art Foundation
Contemplating the Headless Buddha: The Photographic Work of Dinh Q. Lê on BuddhistDoor Global 
Dinh Q. Lê in Conversation with Zoe Butt on the Guggenheim website. 

Vietnamese emigrants to the United States
1968 births
Living people
School of Visual Arts alumni
Vietnamese photographers